In the Babylonian magico-medical tradition, Šulak is the lurker of the bathroom or the demon of the privy. Šulak appears in the Babylonian Diagnostic Handbook (Tablet XXVII), in which various diseases are described and attributed to the "hand" of a god, goddess, or spirit. A "lurker" is a type of demon who lies in wait in places where a potential victim is likely to be alone. When a man attends to excretory functions or elimination, he is exposed and hence vulnerable: "Šulak will hit him!" The "hit" may be a type of "stroke" (mišittu). The demon referred to as "The Hitter" or "Striker" elsewhere in the handbook may be Šulak identified by an epithet. A much earlier reference to this demon is found in a Hittite diagnostic text. Ancient folk etymology held that the name Šulak derived from a phrase meaning "dirty hands", due to his dwelling in the bīt musâti - literally "house of rinse-water", i.e. lavatory. Šulak is described in Akkadian sources as a "rampant" or bipedal but otherwise normal looking lion.

Ancient Mesopotamian medical texts attribute cases of paralysis and stroke to the action of Šulak, a connection possibly due to fears that excessive strain on the toilet could cause such maladies. Protective amulets in the form of the Lion Centaur Urmahlullu, or cuneiform tablets inscribed with  spells to ward off Šulak, were often buried in the doorways of lavatories, or in the foundations of the house, or deposited in drainage pipes.

In the Talmud
A similar lavatory demon takes the form of a goat in the Talmud (Shabbat 67a, Berachot 62a). This "demon of the privy" (Sheid beit ha-Kisset) appears also in the Babylonian Talmud:

Stroke and epilepsy were closely related in ancient medicine. This law is not included in the Mishneh Torah.

The "demon of the privy" is the type of unclean spirit that in the early Christian era was regarded as causing both physical and spiritual affliction.

See also
 Triptych, May–June 1973 by Francis Bacon
 Unclean spirit

Notes

Sources

Geller, M.J. "West Meets East: Early Greek and Babylonian Diagnosis." In Magic and Rationality in Ancient Near Eastern and Graeco-Roman Medicine, Studies in Ancient Medicine 27 (Brill, 2004), p. 19 online.
George, A.R. (2015). On Babylonian Lavatories and Sewars. Iraq, 77: pp 75-106.
Rosner, Fred. Encyclopedia of Medicine in the Bible and the Talmud. Rowman & Littlefield, 2000, p. 96 online.
Stol, Marten. Epilepsy in Babylonia. Brill, 1993, pp. 17, 71, and 76 online.
Stol, Marten. Birth in Babylonia and the Bible: Its Mediterranean Setting. Brill, 2000, p. 167 online.

Further reading
 *Manekin Bamberger, Avigail. "An Akkadian Demon in the Talmud: Between Šulak and Bar-Širiqa", JSJ 44.2 (2013), 282-287.

History of ancient medicine
Excretion
Mesopotamian deities
Demons in Judaism
Toilet deities